Marie–Marguerite Oudry, née Froissé (1688–1780) was a French engraver and painter.

Born in Paris, Oudry studied with Jean-Baptiste Oudry, whom she married in 1709. The couple would have thirteen children, only five of whom, two sons and three daughters, were still alive at the time of her death. Their daughter married the painter Antoine Boizot. Marie–Marguerite Oudry produced engravings after her husband's paintings; she also produced portraits in pastel of him and of one of their sons. She died of an illness in her Paris home.

References

1688 births
1780 deaths
French women painters
French engravers
Women engravers
18th-century French painters
18th-century engravers
18th-century French women artists
Painters from Paris
French women printmakers